Lahm is a surname. Notable people with the surname include:

Frank P. Lahm (1877–1963), American pilot
Philipp Lahm (born 1983), German football player
Samuel Lahm (1812–1876), American lawyer and politician

See also
Lamm